Throwing is an action which consists in accelerating a projectile and then releasing it so that it follows a ballistic trajectory, usually with the aim of impacting a remote target. This action is best characterized for animals with prehensile limbs: in this case the projectile is grasped, while the limb segments impart a motion of the hand through compounded mechanical advantage.  For other animals, the definition of throwing is somewhat unclear, as other actions such as spitting or spraying may or may not be included.

Primates are the most capable throwers in the animal kingdom, and they typically throw feces as a form of agonistic behavior. Of all primates, humans are by far the most capable throwers.  They throw a large variety of projectiles, with a much greater efficacy and accuracy. Humans have thrown projectiles for hunting and in warfare – first through rock-throwing, then refined weapon-throwing (e.g. spear), and into modern day with hand grenades and tear gas canisters.

If humans initially threw objects by hand, they very early designed tools to improve the efficiency of their throwing techniques.  The sling, the bow and arrow, and various models of catapults are notable examples of throwing mechanisms.

With the advent of gun powder, research in throwing mechanisms as ranged weapons essentially halted, but throwing either by hand or with mechanical assistance has persisted for recreational purpose or as a form of exercise.  Throwing is thus still performed in many sports and games, particularly ball games, and in throwing sports the action is the main determiner of the outcome.

Evolutionary history

Throwing dates back 2 million years to Homo erectus. 
Development of the offensive throwing of projectiles is mostly a development of the human lineage, although the aimed throwing of sticks and rocks by male chimpanzees during agonistic displays has been observed, first described by Jane Goodall in 1964.
"Accumulative throwing", that is, the targeted throwing of rocks at a specific target, leading to the gradual accumulation of a stone pile, has also been described for chimpanzees.
Wooden darts were used for hunting at least from the Middle Paleolithic, by Homo heidelbergensis. The spear-thrower is a development of the Upper Paleolithic, certainly in use by the Solutrean (c. 20,000 years ago).

This ability reflects the ability of the human shoulder muscles and tendons to store elasticity until it is needed to propel an object.

Types
Types of throws include overhand throws, underhand throws and using both hands. Overhand throws are thrown predominantly above the shoulder, underhand throws below. Overhand throws are usually significantly faster, and ball speeds of  have been recorded in baseball. Thrown objects can often be intentionally spun for stability or aerodynamic effects.

The notion of throwing typically refers to an action performed without mechanical assistance, but mechanical assistance, as long as it doesn't involve the release of chemical or electric energy, doesn't fundamentally change the nature of the action, and can thus be considered as throwing too.  As such, throwing mechanisms will be discussed in this section.

Overhand throwing motion

The overhand throwing motion is a complex motor skill that involves the entire body in a series of linked movements starting from the legs, progressing up through the pelvis and trunk, and culminating in a ballistic motion in the arm that propels a projectile forward. It is used almost exclusively in athletic events. The throwing motion can be broken down into three basic steps: cocking, accelerating, and releasing.

Desired qualities in the action produce a fast, accurate throw. These qualities are affected by the physical attributes of the thrower like height, strength, and flexibility. However it is mainly the throwing motion mechanics and the thrower's ability to coordinate them that determines the quality of the throw. Determining the desired qualities of the throwing motion is difficult to assess due to the extremely short amount of time that it takes professionals to perform the motion.

Throwing mechanisms

Throwing mechanisms, along with projectiles themselves, rank amongst the oldest technological artefacts in the archaeological records.  They vary greatly in size and complexity, from the hand-held and extremely simple sling, to the very heavy and complex catapults.  These two types of devices have in common with hand-throwing the fact that the only requirements for their projectiles are size and weight.  In that sense they differ from more specialized throwing techniques such as those developed in archery, where the projectiles have very strong requirements for their shape.

Uses

Thrown weapons
Throwing is used for propelling weapons such as stones or spears at enemies, predators, or prey.

Knife throwing, the art of throwing a knife at a target
Spear throwing was used and until relatively recent times was the predominant mode of weaponry used in warfare
Throwing axes are thrown, usually overhand
Boomerangs (throwing sticks) are used by Aboriginals for hunting purposes.
Shurikenjutsu are traditional Japanese thrown weapons
Hand grenades are thrown explosives

Sports and games

Pitching or bowling in bat-and-ball games, e.g. cricket, baseball, softball
Throwing of balls and clubs is used in juggling
Bowling
Darts
Flying disc games
Stone skipping

Track and field contains four major throwing events: discus throw, hammer throw, javelin throw and shot put. The weight throw is the fifth most common field throwing event, while the club throw is unique to disability athletics.

Distant exchange and disposal of artifacts

Throwing can be performed in a non-agonistic way, when the target is a cooperating agent who will perform a somewhat opposite action called catch.  Humans are most likely the only animals capable of throwing with such an intent.  This is an almost exclusively intraspecific behavior, whose goal is to exchange artifacts without having to shorten the distance between the participants.  The seemingly unique exception to this intraspecificity is when humans play a game called fetch with a domestic dog, although in that situation the dog always catches, never throws.

Such use is so common that it is a common metaphor for figuratively sending something to someone (e.g. to throw a bone).

An other very common use of the behavior is for disposal. The employed term is then typically throwing away, and it too is very commonly used figuratively.

Sexual differences
Research by MythBusters found that men and women throw almost equally well with their non-dominant hand, suggesting that the sexual differences were probably due to differences in training.

Non primates

Throwing is rare among non-primates but, provided the definition is relaxed to entail for instance spitting, several examples can be found amongst various taxa, such as camelids, cobras or the archerfish. 

Elephants have been observed throwing rocks and logs, using their trunk to grab and flick items, although they lack the accuracy that primates can achieve, and it is more commonly used as a warning to aggressors.

If one is willing to consider dropping as a special case of throwing, then one can include birds, most notably vultures, as some species are known to drop stones in order to break shells or other hard food sources on the ground.

Orcas are often observed throwing seals in the air, usually by hitting them with their caudal fin.  This behavior is speculated to be purely recreational.

See also
Catch (game)

References

External links

 
Ballistics
Motor skills
Biomechanics
Paleoanthropology
Articles containing video clips